Herbert Henry Wiltshire (1871 – after 1893) was an English footballer who made 27 appearances in the Football League playing for Lincoln City as a left half.

Wiltshire was born in Worcester, and played football for Bristol-based club Warmley. He helped the club win the Gloucestershire Senior Cup in 1892, beating Bedminster by two goals to one, and later that year he was selected to represent Gloucestershire in an inter-county match against Somerset. He contributed to Warmley becoming inaugural champions of the Bristol & District League, in 1892–93; the Bristol Mercury preview of the season to come described him as "a most valuable half-back in last year's team".

Ahead of the 1893–94 Football League season, he turned professional with Lincoln City. He played in all but one of Lincoln's matches in the Second Division as the team finished in mid-table. Nevertheless, at the end of the season he returned to Bristol, his amateur status was reinstated and he resumed his career with Warmley.

References

1871 births
Year of death missing
Sportspeople from Worcester, England
English footballers
Association football wing halves
Lincoln City F.C. players
English Football League players
Western Football League players
Date of birth missing
Place of death missing
Warmley F.C. players